Madame Aema (애마부인 – Aema buin; also known as Mrs. Emma)  is a 1982 South Korean film. A box-office hit, it was one of only two films to sell more than 100,000 tickets in Seoul during the year of 1982.

Synopsis 
While her husband is in prison, Oh Su-bi engages in extramarital affairs. As she is preparing to leave for France with one of her lovers, her husband is released, and she returns to him.

Cast 
 Ahn So-young: Madame Aema (Oh Su-bi)
 Lim Dong-jin: Aema's husband (Shin Hyun-wu)
 Hah Myung-joong
 Ha Jae-young
 Kim Jin-kyu
 Jeon Shook
 Kim Ae-kyung
 Kim Seon-hui
 Moon Tai-sun
 Kim Min-gyu

Background 
Madame Aema was the first erotic film to be made after South Korea's government began relaxing its control of the film industry and the enactment of the so called "3S Act". The government's only interference was to change the Chinese characters used in the film's title. The government censors insisted that the characters in the title be changed from "愛馬婦人" (lit. Horse-Loving Lady) to "愛麻婦人" (lit. Hemp-Loving Lady). Both versions of the title are pronounced, "Aema Buin", a hint at the French film Emmanuelle (1974), which had been popular in Korea. The most sexually explicit South Korean film made up to its time, Madame Aema'''s success ushered in an era of similar erotic films during the 1980s, such as director Lee Doo-yong's Mulberry'' (1986). The film inspired at least 10 sequels, making it the longest-running series in the history of Korean cinema.

References

Bibliography 
 
 
 

 
1982 films
1980s erotic films
1980s Korean-language films